The 1991 Family Circle Cup was a women's tennis tournament played on outdoor clay courts at the Sea Pines Plantation on Hilton Head Island, South Carolina in the United States and was part of Tier I of the 1991 WTA Tour. It was the 19th edition of the tournament and ran from April 2 through April 8, 1991. Second-seeded Gabriela Sabatini won the singles title, her first at the event.

Finals

Singles

 Gabriela Sabatini defeated  Leila Meskhi 6–1, 6–1
 It was Sabatini's 3rd singles title of the year and the 18th of her career.

Doubles

 Claudia Kohde-Kilsch /  Natasha Zvereva defeated  Mary-Lou Daniels /  Lise Gregory 6–4, 6–0
 It was Kohde-Kilsch's 2nd doubles title of the year and the 24th of her career. It was Zvereva's 2nd doubles title of the year and the 12th of her career.

References

External links
 Official website
 ITF tournament edition details
 1991 Main Draw

Family Circle Cup
Charleston Open
Family Circle Cup
Family Circle Cup
Family Circle Cup